Knudsen force is the force experienced by two surfaces at two different temperatures that are separated by a distance comparable to a mean free path of the molecules of the ambient medium.

See also 

 Microcantilever

References

Force